The 2016 Rochester Rhinos season was the club's 21st year of existence, and their sixth season in the third tier of the United States Soccer Pyramid, playing in the United Soccer League Eastern Conference. They entered the season as defending USL champions and made it back to the playoffs, but were eliminated in the conference semi-finals by the New York Red Bulls II.

Roster
as of March 24, 2015

Competitions

Preseason

USL Regular season

Standings

Matches
All times in regular season on Eastern Daylight Time (UTC-04:00)

Schedule source

U.S. Open Cup

USL Playoffs

References

2016 USL season
American soccer clubs 2016 season
2016 in sports in New York (state)
Rochester New York FC seasons